Wojciech Andrzej Dziembowski (born 14 January 1940 in Warsaw), is a Polish astronomer, member of Polish Academy of Sciences and Polish Academy of Learning.

Biography 
He studied at the Jagiellonian University and in 1967 he defended his PhD thesis at the University of Warsaw. He received his professor's degree in 1983. Since 1989 he has been a corresponding member of Polish Academy of Sciences (PAN) and since 2007 he has been a full member of the organization.

Between 1967-1969 he was a fellow at the Columbia University in New York. In 1969 he began working for the CAMK of PAN in Warsaw, Poland, where from 1987 to 1992 he served as director. In 1997 he also became a professor of the Astronomical Observatory at the University of Warsaw.

Publications 
He authored 138 publications in academic magazines that have been reviewed and quoted 7449 times (as of January 2016).

Significant works:
 Oscillations of giants and supergiants, 1977
 Nonlinear mode coupling in oscillating stars, 1982
 The radial gradient in the Sun's rotation, 1989
 Solar model from helioseismology and the neutrino flux problem, 1990
 The opacity mechanism in B-type stars, 1993
 Oscillations of α UMa and other red giants, 2001
 Asteroseismology of the β Cephei star ν Eridani, 2004

Awards 
 Award of the 3rd Department of Mathematics, Physics and Chemistry PAN (1978)
 Medaille de l’Adion of the Nice Observatory (2000)
 Golden Medal of the University of Wrocław (2005)
 Bohdan Paczyński Medal of the Polish Astronomical Society (2019)

References

External links 
 Who Is Who Physics Poland
 Wojciech Andrzej Dziembowski at PAN

1940 births
Living people
20th-century Polish astronomers
21st-century Polish astronomers
People from Warsaw
Jagiellonian University alumni
Members of the Polish Academy of Sciences
Members of the Polish Academy of Learning